125 West 55th Street, also known as Avenue of the Americas Plaza, is a 23-story,  office building located on 55th Street between the Avenue of the Americas (Sixth Avenue) and Seventh Avenue in Midtown Manhattan, New York City.  The building also has an entrance at 120 West 56th Street, across the street from the Le Parker Meridien Hotel.

The building, designed by Edward Larrabee Barnes and John MY Lee Architects, has  floorplates. The second floor of the building houses Air France's United States executive offices. Macquarie Bank houses its New York representative office in the building. Boston Properties currently owns and manages the building. The building also houses offices of Katz Media Group, a division of iHeartMedia.

History

Development
The building, constructed by Fisher Brothers, cost $60 million in 1988 dollars. The Saint Thomas Choir School previously occupied the site, and moved into a new building at 202 West 58th Street. 

Construction on 125 West 55th Street began in 1988. In order to capitalize on a City of New York zoning bonus, the developers planned to have the building's foundation installed by May 13, 1988; buildings in the area installed before a deadline in the northern hemisphere spring of 1988 received a 20% increase in size in order to spur development of western Midtown Manhattan. The developers planned to have tenants begin occupying the building in May 1989. The building was completed in 1990.

Use
In 1991, Air France leased  of space in the building. As of July 10, 1991, it was the largest lease in Manhattan in the year 1991. The airline had planned to move its Northeast United States headquarters, its U.S. reservation center, and its New York City ticket office to the building beginning in 1992. Air France had its previous ticket office at 666 Fifth Avenue and its previous reservation department at 888 Seventh Avenue, and wanted a larger ticket office facility and overhauled reservation department offices. It moved both departments into 125 West 55th Street. Air France opted to move into 125 West 55th Street instead of spending $2.5 million to upgrade the telecommunications systems and remove asbestos at 888 Seventh Avenue; 125 West 55th Street came with the latest fiber optics systems and did not have asbestos. Air France has since closed the street-level retail ticket office.

As of November 24, 1991, the Katz lease was the fourth largest lease in New York City. During that year the National Bank of Canada and Credietbank were tenants in the building.

In the summer of 1992, LeBoeuf, Lamb, Leiby & MacRae moved 1,200 employees into the building. The firm had consolidated from several previous locations, and occupied eight floors and the concourse level. The LeBouef deal, signed in 1991, was that year's second largest lease in New York City as of November 24, 1991.

Boston Properties acquired the building in 2008, for $444 million. In 2010 MetLife refinanced a portion of the debt of the building. As of 2011 the building was worth $345 million. In 2011 a former deputy of Harry Macklowe, former head of the Macklowe Group, filed a lawsuit against Macklowe, saying that Macklowe did not share the proceeds of the sale of 125 West 55th Street.

Design
Thomas L. Waite of The New York Times said in 1988, before the completion of the building, that the blue glass sheathing around it "may give it a pastoral sheen." Waite said that the design of 125 West 55th Street is similar to that of the Metropolitan Tower.

Tenants
 Au Bon Pain has a location at 125 West 55th Street.
 Starbucks has a location on the 56th Street side of this building, as does Chop't
 Estatorio Milos is a seafood restaurant on the ground floor
 Macquarie Group is housed on the upper floors
 iHeartMedia and its subsidiary, Katz Media Group, are housed on floors 3-14 and 21

References
Notes

External links
 "125 West 55th Street." Macklowe Properties
 "Avenue of the Americas Plaza." Emporis

1990 establishments in New York City
Air France–KLM
Commercial buildings completed in 1990
Midtown Manhattan
Skyscraper office buildings in Manhattan